"Did You Give Enough Love" is a song by Canadian singer Celine Dion, released as the sixth and final single from her second English-language studio album, Celine Dion (1992). The song was released in July 1993 as a radio single in Canada. It was written by Seth Swirsky and Arnie Roman, and produced by Ric Wake.

Background and release
The promotional CD contained also two remixes of "Did You Give Enough Love" created by Jean-Pierre Isaac: Remix 45" and 12" Club Mix. The single was released without a cover, but there was a pictured CD. The song peaked at number 17 in Canada. "Did You Give Enough Love" was included also on "The Power of Love" European single, released the next year. Dion performed the song during her Celine Dion in Concert tour in 1992 and 1993.

Critical reception
American magazine Billboard described the song as a "beat-laden" pop tune. Parry Gettelman from Orlando Sentinel felt that Dion "really excels" on the dance track "in the Lisa Stansfield mold".

Music video
A black-and-white music video was made in 1993. It was directed by Alain DesRochers and shot in Montreal.

Track listing
Canadian promotional CD single
"Did You Give Enough Love" (Remix 45") – 4:22
"Did You Give Enough Love" (12" Club Mix) – 6:44
"Did You Give Enough Love" (Album Version) – 4:21

Charts

References

1992 songs
1993 singles
Celine Dion songs
Columbia Records singles
Epic Records singles
Song recordings produced by Ric Wake
Songs written by Arnie Roman
Songs written by Seth Swirsky